Hammer of God is the eighth studio album by the Australian Christian extreme metal band Mortification, released on 27 July 1999. 

It was provided to celebrate their tenth year, sales of 250,000 albums in Europe and the United States.

The group promoted the album with a European tour. 

It contains three demo versions of tracks that were included on the band's 1998 studio album Triumph of Mercy. The song "God Rulz" is a re-recorded version of the track "The Majestic Infiltration of Order" from both Mortification's self-titled debut studio album and their Break the Curse demo album. A reissue of Hammer of God was released in 2008 on Metal Mind Productions, which removed one of the demo tracks and included three bonus tracks. In 2021, a reissue was released by Soundmass with new remastering, five bonus tracks, an updated cover, and a second disc containing the 10 Years Live Not Dead album.

Reception 
Cross Rhythms gave the album a 9/10.

Track listing

1. Song not included on the 2008 reissue.

2. Songs not included on the 2021 reissue.

2. Songs from 10 Years Live Not Dead (2000).

Personnel

Mortification
Steve Rowe – vocals, bass guitar
Lincoln Bowen – guitar
Keith Bannister – drums

Additional musicians
Mark McCormack – piano, keyboards
Sally Peart – harp
Leighton Rowe – ending vocals on "God Rulz"
Dougie, Joyce Madil, Sally Peart, Tim Perry, Johny Stoj, Rod Strong – backing vocals

Production
Steve Rowe – executive production
Mark McCormack – producer, engineer

Additional personnel
Calvin Vice – cover artwork (original version)
Phil Gibson, Mark Kelson for SCREWart – layout
10 Years Live Not Dead recorded 1 October 1999 at the Black Stump Festival in Appin, New South Wales, Australia
Scott Waters (Ultimatum) – cover artwork (2021 version, Hammer of God)
Tobias Jäpel – remastering (2021 version)
Phil Lake – live engineer (2021 version, disc two)
Mark McCormack, Fab – mix engineers (2021 version, disc two live tracks)
Troy Dumire – cover painting (2021 version, 10 Years Live Not Dead)

Notes
The abbreviation "D.W.A.M." stands for "Daniel was a mosher," a phrase repeated throughout the song.

References

External links
Hammer of God at Metal Archives

Mortification (band) albums
1999 albums